This is a list of American films released in 1909.

See also
 1909 in the United States

References

External links

1909 films at the Internet Movie Database

1909
Films
American
1900s in American cinema